Doksan-dong is a dong, neighbourhood of Geumcheon-gu in Seoul, South Korea.

See also 
Administrative divisions of South Korea

References

External links
Geumcheon-gu official website
 Geumcheon-gu map at the Geumcheon-gu official website
 Doksan-dong Resident offices website

Neighbourhoods of Geumcheon District